Julia Ratcliffe (born 14 July 1993) is a retired New Zealand track and field athlete who specialised in the hammer throw. She won the gold medal at the 2018 Commonwealth Games in the Gold Coast, having won the silver medal at the 2014 Commonwealth Games in Glasgow.

Personal life 
Ratcliffe was born in Hamilton to Dave and Sue Ratcliffe, and has one older sister, Sarah. She attended Waikato Diocesan School for Girls, where she was head girl and dux in her final year. In her youth, she participated in various sports including hockey, netball, and hurdling.

Ratcliffe attended Princeton University in New Jersey, United States. She graduated in 2017 with a Bachelor of Arts, with a major in economics and a certificate in political economy. As of April 2020, she works as an economic analyst for the Reserve Bank of New Zealand.

Career 
Ratcliffe began participating in hammer throw at age 12.

In 2014, Ratcliffe won the NCAA hammer throw title, becoming Princeton University's first female track and field NCAA champion.

Ratcliffe held the New Zealand national record in the hammer throw from July 2012 until September 2020. She reclaimed the national title in March 2021, setting a new national record of 73.55 metres at the New Zealand Track and Field Championships.

In April 2021, Ratcliffe was selected to compete at the 2020 Summer Olympics in Tokyo.

Ratcliffe announced her retirement on 13 January 2023.

Statistics

Annual progression 

Source: Athletics New Zealand Records & Rankings

International results

References

External links
 

1993 births
Living people
New Zealand female hammer throwers
Olympic athletes of New Zealand
Athletes (track and field) at the 2010 Summer Youth Olympics
Athletes (track and field) at the 2020 Summer Olympics
Commonwealth Games competitors for New Zealand
Commonwealth Games gold medallists for New Zealand
Commonwealth Games silver medallists for New Zealand
Commonwealth Games medallists in athletics
Commonwealth Games gold medallists in athletics
Athletes (track and field) at the 2014 Commonwealth Games
Athletes (track and field) at the 2018 Commonwealth Games
Athletes (track and field) at the 2022 Commonwealth Games
Universiade medalists in athletics (track and field)
Universiade bronze medalists for New Zealand
Medalists at the 2015 Summer Universiade
Princeton University alumni
People educated at Waikato Diocesan School
20th-century New Zealand women
21st-century New Zealand women
Medallists at the 2022 Commonwealth Games